Raziel is a fictional character and a main protagonist in the Legacy of Kain video game series. Introduced in 1999 as the lead and playable character of Legacy of Kain: Soul Reaver, he was created by Amy Hennig, Seth Carus and Arnold Ayala of Crystal Dynamics. He reappears as the protagonist of Soul Reaver 2, and returns as a playable character alongside series eponym, Kain, in Legacy of Kain: Defiance, which closes his story arc.

Portrayed as a tragic hero, Raziel is described as an "ex-vampire" or "wraith". First appearing in Soul Reaver as one of Kain's lieutenants, he is executed after surpassing Kain, but is "resurrected" by The Elder God as a reaver of souls, bent on avenging himself by slaying his brethren and former master. Over the course of this journey, his history is revealed in reverse, and his motivations and loyalties gradually change as he unearths the truth behind his cyclic destiny.

Raziel's story and appearance were inspired by several influences, including the 1920 silent film The Cabinet of Dr. Caligari, John Milton's Paradise Lost, and the Hindu god Vishnu. Outside of the main series, he has featured in two tie-in comics, and in Crystal Dynamics' Lara Croft and the Guardian of Light. In all of his voiced appearances, he has been played by Michael Bell. Video game critics and players have reacted positively to his character, praising his design, backstory and development.

Concept and creation
The character of Raziel had a precursor in the protagonist of Shifter, a Paradise Lost-inspired game proposal worked on by Crystal Dynamics' Amy Hennig, Seth Carus and Arnold Ayala. During pre-production on Shifter, the development team was asked to adapt the project into a sequel to an earlier Crystal Dynamics-published title which Hennig and Carus had worked on - Blood Omen: Legacy of Kain - and Shifter'''s main character was reconceptualized as Raziel for the final product, Soul Reaver. His name was derived from that of the homonymous archangel, and his early concept art was influenced by Cesare from The Cabinet of Dr. Caligari. Dozens of sketches were produced to shape his final design; the Hindu god Vishnu provided the basis for his blue color, and his wings were intended to evoke those of fallen angels.

Raziel is voiced by Michael Bell in all of his appearances. In the series' fictional universe, he is described as an "ex-vampire", a "wraith", and a "devourer of souls",Elder God: Did you think to receive the same favors after your rebellion as before? No, Raziel. I have no need for you to enter the physical world, so no conduit will be granted. You serve me adequately as a wraith, and a wraith you will remain.  characterized by his skeletal figure, brown cowl, tattered wings and tridactyl claws and feet. Throughout the games, he is required to consume souls to survive, travels between two planes of existence (the material and spectral realms) to solve puzzles, and wields the wraith-blade—a ghostly version of the Soul Reaver, an ancient sword inhabited by a sentient spirit. The design of his human incarnation in Soul Reaver 2 was inspired by the Roman era. According to Hennig, Raziel's role in the story conforms to that of a tragic hero. While writing dialogue, she considered it important to include character flaws in his personality, enabling him to act as a foil to series protagonist Kain. In Soul Reaver, Raziel is depicted with aspects of both villainy and heroism, and in Soul Reaver 2, Hennig deliberately portrayed him as "kind of a self-righteous little twit" with a lot to learn.

Appearances
In video games

Raziel is introduced in Legacy of Kain: Soul Reaver as a vampire sired by the spiritually-corrupted despot Kain, the first of Kain's six lieutenants, and his second-in-command. He surpasses Kain, who - ostensibly motivated by jealously - condemns Raziel to death. Raziel is resurrected by The Elder God, and traverses Nosgoth (the fictional setting of the series), embarking on a quest for vengeance. He confronts Kain, who attacks him with his legendary blade, the Soul Reaver; the Reaver mysteriously shatters when it strikes Raziel. The spirit formerly captive within the sword binds itself to Raziel, becoming his symbiotic weapon—the wraith-blade. Raziel discovers that, when they were human, he and the other lieutenants were the leaders of the ancient vampire-hunting Sarafan brotherhood; Kain found their corpses and raised them, unwitting, as vampires, in a calculated act of blasphemous irony. Raziel kills Kain's remaining lieutenants and tracks him down again, but is cheated of revenge when Kain activates a time machine and slips into Nosgoth's past.

In Soul Reaver 2, while in pursuit of Kain, Raziel explores the past, learning more of his own history as a former member of the Sarafan, and discovering Kain's ultimate goal—to restore balance to Nosgoth.Kain: If you truly believe in free will, Raziel, now is the time to prove it. Kill me now, and we both become pawns of history, dragged down the path of an artificial destiny. I was ordained to assume the role of Balance Guardian in Nosgoth, while you were destined to be its savior. But the map of my fate was redrawn by Moebius, and so in turn was yours...  Kain had Raziel executed in Soul Reaver in order to create a temporal paradox. By exploiting Raziel's unique free will, Kain can defy the course of history and alter time. In hopes of learning more about his destiny, Raziel time travels back to the era of the Sarafan, where the ancient vampire Janos Audron gifts him the Reaver—a younger version of the Soul Reaver blade, before it housed a ravenous spirit. However, they are ambushed by the Sarafan leaders, including Raziel's former self, who slays Janos. Raziel renounces his heritage by using the Reaver to kill his former comrades and his younger self, thus providing the corpses for Kain to turn into vampires in the future. The Reaver then turns against Raziel, and he realizes that the entity destined to become trapped within the blade has always been him; the sword shattered against him in Soul Reaver because it could not consume its own soul. Kain saves Raziel from being absorbed by the Reaver, but this causes a temporal paradox which changes Nosgoth's history for the worse, and only postpones Raziel's fate.

In Legacy of Kain: Defiance, Raziel discovers that it was prophesied in the distant past that two champions would battle to decide the fate of Nosgoth. Raziel seeks to revive Janos, but learns that he must kill Kain to do so. Coaxed into believing that they are the champions, Raziel and Kain fight, with Raziel the victor. He resurrects Janos, who enables him to enhance the wraith-blade with spiritual powers, but to little avail; Raziel is trapped by The Elder God.Ariel: Yes, Raziel – yet I am much more than I was. The veil is lifted from my sight. My spirit, united with the souls of my predecessors, is drawn here now for the final baptism of the blade. To restore Balance, the sword must be rendered pure by Spirit. Release me, Raziel – the Soul Reaver has the power. Release us all. For this we were called.  While in captivity, he reaches the epiphany that he is both champions (Kain was neither); his free will allows him to determine Nosgoth's ultimate future. He reflects that the Elder is the cause of all the conflict and strife throughout history, and when Kain re-emerges, alive, with the Reaver, Raziel reconciles with him and willingly surrenders to the sword.Raziel: The Soul Reaver – pure of all corruption – this is what it is for. This is what I am for – The two become one – both Soul Reavers – together – and the Scion of Balance is healed. And I – am not your enemy – not your destroyer – I am, as before, your right hand. Your sword. / Kain: No, Raziel – this can't be the way... / Raziel: And now you will see – the true enemy –  Before his soul is consumed, he disperses the wraith-blade into Kain, simultaneously curing Kain's corruption, dooming himself to thousands of years of torment in the Reaver, and releasing his future self from that same imprisonment. Kain uses the newly created Soul Reaver to battle The Elder God, and concludes that Raziel's sacrifice has offered him "mere" hope.

In merchandise and promotion
Several action figures and figurines of Raziel have been created by Blue Box Interactive and the NECA in partnership with Eidos. He was also featured in Top Cow's promotional comics for Soul Reaver and Defiance, and appears alongside Kain as a playable character in downloadable content (DLC) for 2010's Lara Croft and the Guardian of Light. Additionally, his likeness is used by a bot in Astro's Playroom. 

Reception
Received positively by players and the gaming press, Raziel was praised by GameSpot's Greg Kasavin, who wrote in his review Defiance that "it's rare enough to find a truly memorable main character in a game, let alone two", and closed deeming the title "one of those rare games whose characters and story to some extent supersede the problems in the gameplay". Official UK PlayStation Magazine welcomed Raziel's debut in Soul Reaver, showcasing him on the cover of issue 43; his story and in-game appearance were endorsed, and in a comparison with Tomb Raider III, his free-flowing character animation was described as making "Lara look like a glove puppet".

Reviewing the Dreamcast port of Soul Reaver, IGN's Jeremy Dunham described Raziel's narrative as one of the most convincing he had ever heard, echoed later in the site's review for Legacy of Kain: Defiance, which described the series' cast as "just damn good at talking like vampires, tortured souls and gods". GameSpot included Soul Reaver in a 1999 list of ten computer games with the best voice acting of all time, stating about Bell that "you'd never guess that the same person carried out all those voices", and of the cast "there's not one weak link in the bunch, and together they create one of the best examples of voice acting in a game for PC or consoles". In contrast, Douglass C. Perry of IGN felt Raziel's (and Kain's) dialogue in Soul Reaver 2 was overdone, stating that "overwritten text makes them sound like caffeine-imbued English students verbally jousting in their first semester in college," but liked the advancement and rebalancing of Raziel's personality and aggressiveness, and enjoyed his depiction, stating that he "looks magnificently decripid ".

Alongside Kain, Raziel was selected by IGN's readers as one of ten heroes most wanted to appear in the 2008 fighting game Soulcalibur IV, and was ranked ninth on Electronic Gaming Monthlys list of top ten badass undead that same year. In 2009, he was inducted into Diehard GameFANs list of top ten video game vampires (dubbed as "Not A Vampire #2"), and was included as one of GameSpot's 64 All Time Greatest Game Heroes (where he, however, lost in the first round of user voting elimination to Donkey Kong), while Thunderbolt ranked him as ninth on their list of the top videogame antiheroes.

In 2010, GamesRadar listed him as one of eight "videogame characters we'd go gay for". In 2012, Houston Press listed the character's demise in Legacy of Kain: Defiance'' among the top five most heartbreaking video game deaths, while IGN also listed Raziel and Kain among gaming's most notorious anti-heroes and "complex characters with a great backstory, and truly awesome anti-heroes, be they fighting against each other to enslave or save the world, or teaming up against greater threats". That same year, GamesRadar ranked him as the 56th "most memorable, influential, and badass" protagonist in games, adding that "as pissed-off vampire antiheroes go, few wear the title as proudly as Raziel".

References

Action-adventure game characters
Fantasy video game characters
Fictional characters who can turn intangible
Fictional lieutenants
Fictional revolutionaries
Fictional soul collectors
Fictional swordfighters in video games
Fictional vampire hunters 
Ghost characters in video games
Horror video game characters
Fictional hunters in video games
Legacy of Kain characters
Male characters in video games
Square Enix protagonists
Undead superheroes
Vampire characters in video games
Video game bosses
Video game characters introduced in 1999
Video game characters with superhuman strength
Video game characters who can move at superhuman speeds
Video game characters who can turn invisible